Alexi Peuget (born 18 December 1990) is a French professional footballer who plays as a defensive midfielder for Championnat National 2 club Rumilly-Vallières, where he is the captain.

Career
In his final season with Strasbourg, Peuget reached the senior team and made 25 appearances scoring two goals in the 2010–11 season. Due to Strasbourg entering liquidation in the 2011 off-season, Peuget was a part of a mass clear-out, which resulted in his move to Reims.

On 30 June 2019, Saint-Malo confirmed that Peuget had joined the club. In 2020, he signed for Rumilly-Vallières. He captained the side that made the semi-finals of the Coupe de France in the 2020–21 season, where he was the sole goalscorer for the club in a 5–1 loss to Monaco.

Personal life 
Alexi's father is former Mulhouse player Jean-Michel Peuget, and he also has a younger brother who played in the youth academy of Auxerre.

References

External links
 
 
 

Living people
1990 births
Footballers from Mulhouse
French footballers
Association football midfielders
RC Strasbourg Alsace players
Stade de Reims players
LB Châteauroux players
Grenoble Foot 38 players
Jura Sud Foot players
US Saint-Malo players
GFA Rumilly-Vallières players
Ligue 1 players
Ligue 2 players
Championnat National players
Championnat National 2 players
Championnat National 3 players